Pieter Jacobus Oud (5 December 1886 – 12 August 1968) was a Dutch politician of the defunct Free-thinking Democratic League (VDB) party and later co-founder of the Labour Party (PvdA) and the People's Party for Freedom and Democracy (VVD) and historian. He was granted the honorary title of Minister of State on 9 November 1963.

Oud attended the Barlaeus Gymnasium in Amsterdam from May 1889 until June 1904, and applied at the Amsterdam University of Applied Sciences in June 1904, majoring in civil law notary and obtaining a Bachelor of Civil Law degree in July 1907. Oud took several curses in accounting from a certified teacher in Gorinchem from July 1907 until April 1909. Oud worked as civil servant for the Ministry of Finance from May 1909 until June 1917 for the department of Budgetary Affairs from May 1909 until September 1911 and as a tax collector for the Fiscal Information and Investigation Service (FIOD) on Texel from September 1911 until February 1914 and in Ommen from February 1914 until June 1917. Oud applied at the University of Amsterdam in April 1912 for a postgraduate education in Law, graduating with an Master of Laws degree in February 1914. After the Battle of the Frontiers, Oud was conscripted in the Regiment Infanterie Oranje Gelderland of the Royal Netherlands Army, serving as a Sergeant from August 1914 until November 1916.

Oud was elected as a Member of the House of Representatives in the 1917 general election, taking office on 28 June 1917. Oud also worked as editor-in-chief of the party newspaper De Vrijzinnig-Democraat from 15 May 1919 until 26 May 1933. After the 1933 election, Oud was appointed as Minister of Finance in the second Colijn cabinet, taking office on 26 May 1933. After the Leader of the Free-thinking Democratic League Henri Marchant retired after 19 years he endorsed Oud as his successor. Marchant stepping down on 18 May 1935 and was succeeded by Oud. The second Colijn cabinet fell on 23 July 1935 and was replaced by the third Colijn cabinet, with Oud continuing to serve as Minister of Finance, taking office on 31 July 1935. Following the 1937 election, Oud returned to the House of Representatives, taking office on 8 June 1937, but asked Dolf Joekes to remain as Parliamentary leader of the Free-thinking Democratic League in the House of Representatives until 20 September 1937. The third Colijn cabinet was replaced by the fourth Colijn cabinet on 24 June 1937. In October 1938 Oud was nominated as Mayor of Rotterdam, and he announced his resignation as Leader and Parliamentary leader, endorsing his long-serving deputy Dolf Joekes as his successor. Oud resigned Leader and Parliamentary leader the day he was installed as Mayor, taking office on 15 October 1938.

On 14 May 1940 the Luftwaffe destroyed almost the entire historic city centre of Rotterdam during the German invasion, leading the Dutch government to capitulate the next day. On 10 October 1941 Oud resigned in protest against the German occupation and was briefly detained in the Ilag Sint-Michielsgestel in the summer of 1942. During the rest of the German occupation Oud wrote dozens of books on history and politics. Following the end of World War II, Oud was again appointed as Mayor of Rotterdam, taking office on 7 May 1945. On 9 February 1946 the Free-thinking Democratic League (VDB), the Social Democratic Workers' Party (SDAP) and the Christian Democratic Union (CDU) chose to merge to form the Labour Party (PvdA). Oud was one of its co-founders, but left the party a year later, after which he and several other former members of the Free-thinking Democratic League formed the rump party Committee-Oud in February 1947. On 24 January 1948 the Committee-Oud and the Freedom Party (PvdV) chose to merge to form the People's Party for Freedom and Democracy (VVD). Oud became the first Leader of the People's Party for Freedom and Democracy.

For the 1948 election, Oud was the lijsttrekker (lead candidate) of the People's Party for Freedom and Democracy. The party had six seats in the House of House of Representatives previously held by the Freedom Party and won two additional seats, now having eight seats in the House of Representatives. Oud again returned as a Member of the House of Representatives and became the party's first Parliamentary leader on 27 July 1948. The following cabinet formation resulted in a coalition agreement between the People's Party for Freedom and Democracy, the Catholic People's Party (KVP), the Labour Party and the Christian Historical Union (CHU) which formed the Drees–Van Schaik cabinet, with Oud opting to remain in the House of Representatives instead of filling a ministerial post. Oud also served as Chairman of the People's Party for Freedom and Democracy from 8 April 1949 until 9 November 1963. Oud served continuously as Leader and Parliamentary leader for the next 15 years and was lijsttrekker for the elections of 1952, 1956 and 1959. In January 1963, Oud announced his retirement from national politics, stating that he would not stand for the 1963 election. Shortly after the election, on 16 May 1963, Oud stepped down as Leader and Parliamentary leader, and was succeeded as Leader by Edzo Toxopeus and as Parliamentary leader by Roelof Zegering Hadders until Edzo Toxopeus took over as Parliamentary leader on 2 July 1963 but retained his seat in the House of Representatives and continued to serve as a backbencher until the end of the parliamentary term on 5 June 1963.

Following the end of his active political career, Oud occupied numerous seats as a corporate director and nonprofit director for supervisory boards in the business and industry world and for supervisory boards for several international non-governmental organisations and research institutes (Royal Dutch Shell, Philips, Van Lanschot, Netherlands Atlantic Association, Carnegie Foundation and the Royal Netherlands Historical Society) and served on several state commissions on behalf of the government.

Life

Life before politics
Oud came from a middle-class family. His father traded in tobacco, wine, and later stocks, and served as alderman in Purmerend. Oud attended HBS in Amsterdam, graduating in 1904. He continued to study to become notary between 1904 and 1907. During this time he had become member of the board of the League of Freethinking Propaganda Associations, the freethinking liberal youth organisation. He took a private courses in registration in Gorinchem between 1907 and 1909. Between 1909 and 1911 he was civil servant within the ministry of Finance responsible for registration and government possessions. In 1911 he became a tax collector on Texel. In 1912 he took his matriculation to study law at the University of Amsterdam. He combined his work as tax collector with his study of law. In the same year he married Johanna Cornelia Fischer, from this marriage they got one son. In 1914 he became tax collector in Ommen. Meanwhile, he was mobilised as Sergeant of the seventh regiment infantry, which was stationed near Amsterdam between 1914 and 1916. Between 1915 and 1919 he was member of the national board of the VDB. He graduated in 1917 on basis of a disputation.

Political life

For the VDB
Oud was elected in 1917 election for the VDB, the last election with runoff voting. He defeated Staalman of the left-wing Christian Democratic Party in the second round in the district of Den Helder. He retained his legal position as tax collector, but was given a leave for undetermined time. He was even promoted to inspector of finances in 1921, while on leave. In the 1918 election Oud stood for elections again, and was elected with 5,000 preference votes, mainly from the former district of Den Helder. While MP, Oud also served as secretary of the VDB national board and editor of the De Vrijzinnige Democraat, the party's magazine. In parliament Oud took a particular interest in military matters and education, and served as the party's finance spokesperson. As MP he served as member of the Committee on the Navy between 1923 and 1933 and the Committee on the Army since 1925. He was chairman of the association for the promotion of public education "People's Education" for many years.

After the 1933 election, Oud was appointed Minister of Finance in the second cabinet led by Hendrik Colijn. As minister, he was responsible for a large scale operation of budget cuts, during a time of economic crisis. In 1935 he proposed the Bezuigingswet 1935 ("Budget Cut Act 1935"), which involved many budget cuts and financial reorganisations: salaries of civil servants were cut, the old age pensions were financed in a different way and for budgetary reasons, soldiers were to become civil servants after a certain period. Although his proposals lead to a political crisis, they were nonetheless carried by parliament. In the same year, after Henri Marchant left the VDB following a scandal, Oud succeeded him as political leader of the VDB. Oud led the VDB in the 1937 election and returned to the House of Representatives as chair of the parliamentary party. He also served as chair for the committee on government expenditure.

In Rotterdam
He left the House of Representatives in 1938 to become mayor of Rotterdam. As mayor he also served in the College of Curators of the University of Rotterdam and as chair of the Association of Dutch Municipalities. After he stepped down in 1952 he became honorary chairman of that association. In 1939 he was elected into the States-Provincial of South Holland. In August 1939 he was offered the position of Minister of Finance in the cabinet of Dirk Jan de Geer, but declined.

Controversially, Oud did not resign after the German invasion of 1940, although he was not a member of the National Socialist Movement in the Netherlands (NSB). During his period as mayor, he was involved in the reconstruction of the centre of Rotterdam which was destroyed by the German bombings. He was heavily criticised by Dutch politicians for cooperating too much with the NSB, while the NSB criticised him for being uncooperative. In the spring of 1941 he was brutally harassed by members of the NSB, twelve party-members invaded the City Hall, gagged Oud, adorned him with Freemason-like symbols and made pictures of him. In the autumn of 1941 he resigned as mayor and he stood down as member of the States Provincial. He was succeeded by Frederik Ernst Müller. In the summer of 1942 he was briefly held in Sint-Michielsgestel, where many prominent Dutch politicians were held captive. During the war Oud kept far from the resistance movement and instead committed himself to writing several books on parliamentary history. Meanwhile, he kept close contact with important people from the business and the political world of Rotterdam.

In 1945, after the liberation of the Netherlands, he returned to Rotterdam as mayor, although he was also asked to become mayor of Amsterdam, and he was officially re-appointed in 1946. In the same year the VDB merged with the social democratic SDAP and the left-wing Christian CDU to form the Labour Party. Oud was one of the co-founders of this party and served on the party's board between 1946 and 1947. Meanwhile, he served on many government, business, international and civil society committees, he chaired the government committee for municipal finances between 1946 and 1954, he was member of the board of trustees of the banker Staal, he was member of the pension council of the Dutch Reformed Church since 1946 and he served as chair of the International Union of Municipalities and Local Governments between 1948 and 1954.

For the VVD
On 3 October 1947, Oud sent a letter to the board of the PvdA announcing his resignation as a member. The reason he gave for the split was that the PvdA was moving too much into socialist waters, instead of being committed to progressive politics. The fact that he was refused a position on the party list for the Senate is generally seen as the political reason for Oud's split. Oud never felt at home in the new social democratic party.

He immediately founded the Committee of Preparation of the Foundation of a Democratic People's Party, which prepared the foundation of the VVD. He negotiated the merger of the remnants of the old VDB with the newly founded Freedom Party. On 24 January 1948 he became one of the founding members of the liberal People's Party for Freedom and Democracy, together with Dirk Stikker and Henk Korthals, and served in its first national board as vice-chair. In 1948 he was elected to the House of Representatives for the VVD, and became chair of its parliamentary party, combining this position with the position of chair of the party's organisation.

In parliament he mainly spoke on issues of administrative and constitutional law. He was a very influential member of parliament. When the law concerning the decolonisation of Indonesia, a very controversial issue, was voted on, the two-thirds majority was only reached because an amendment proposed by Oud ensured the support of the VVD. In 1950–51 Oud came into conflict with the VVD's Minister of Foreign Affairs, Stikker, over the policy concerning Netherlands New Guinea. Between 1950 and 1953 he was a member of the Government Committee Van Schaik, which prepared a constitutional change. In 1952 he did not seek to be reappointed as Rotterdam's mayor, and instead became extraordinary professor of Constitutional Administrative law at the University of Rotterdam, which he remained until 1957. Between 1953 and 1963 he was chair of the Justice Committee of the House of Representatives. As such, he was heavily involved in the preparation of many laws, and served as chair on the committees preparing the laws on the provinces, the police, archives, patents and many more. In 1959 he came into conflict with Harm van Riel, the chair of the VVD's parliamentary party in the Senate, because Van Riel wanted to become minister, but Oud denied him this.

In the last years of his period in the House of Representatives, Oud was the eldest member of the House and on many times functioned as Speaker, such as when a new Speaker was elected. Before the 1963 election Oud announced that he would not continue as MP; he was succeeded by the Minister of the Interior Edzo Toxopeus. In the same year, he was appointed as Minister of State, an honorary title.

Life after politics
After 1963, Oud retired from Dutch political life. He was only asked upon at times of great crisis. In 1966 he was member of the committee that advised the government on the ministerial responsibility towards members of the royal house, together with Willem Drees. In the same year, he co-authored a book on a new constitution.

When Oud died in 1968, his family wanted to announce his death after the burial. His general practitioner did not know this, and told a patient that evening that Oud had died that afternoon. The father of this patient happened to be a journalist for the socialist paper Het Vrije Volk, which published a large In Memoriam the next morning.

Trivia
Jacobus Oud, a famous Dutch architect, was his brother.
Oud was a respected voice in parliament, not only because he spoke with a soft high pitched voice, but also because he was the House's conscience when it came to constitutional issues and administrative laws.
Oud was a lifelong member of the freethinking Protestant broadcasting organisation, VPRO.

Decorations

Bibliography
 "Om de Democratie" (1929; "For Democracy")
 "Het jongste verleden: Parlementaire geschiedenis van Nederland, 1918–1940" (1946; The recent past: parliamentary history of the Netherlands, 1918-194-)
 "Honderd jaren: Hoofdzaken der Nederlandsche staatkundige geschiedenis, 1840–1940" (1946; One hundred years, Important matters of the Dutch political history 1840–1940)
 "Het constitutionele recht van het Koninkrijk der Nederlanden" (1947–1953; The constitutional law of the Kingdom of the Netherlands)
 "Proeve van een Grondwet (1966; Attempt at a constitution)

References

External links

Official
  Mr. P.J. (Pieter) Oud Parlement & Politiek

 

|-

 

 

1886 births
1968 deaths
Chairmen of the People's Party for Freedom and Democracy
Commanders of the Order of the Netherlands Lion
Dutch corporate directors
Van Lanschot Kempen people
Dutch fiscal jurists
Dutch legal scholars
Dutch magazine editors
Dutch members of the Dutch Reformed Church
Dutch nonprofit directors
Dutch nonprofit executives
Dutch people of World War II
Dutch political party founders
Dutch political philosophers
Dutch prisoners of war in World War II
Dutch publishers (people)
Dutch public administration scholars
Dutch scholars of constitutional law
Academic staff of Erasmus University Rotterdam
Free-thinking Democratic League politicians
Governmental studies academics
Grand Croix of the Légion d'honneur
Grand Crosses of the Order of the Crown (Belgium)
Grand Crosses of the Order of the House of Orange
Knights Grand Cross of the Order of Orange-Nassau
Labour Party (Netherlands) politicians
Leaders of the People's Party for Freedom and Democracy
Mayors of Rotterdam
Members of the House of Representatives (Netherlands)
Members of the Provincial Council of South Holland
Ministers of Finance of the Netherlands
Ministers of State (Netherlands)
Public historians
People from Purmerend
People's Party for Freedom and Democracy politicians
Scholars of administrative law
Tax collectors
University of Amsterdam alumni
Vice Chairmen of the People's Party for Freedom and Democracy
World War II civilian prisoners
World War II prisoners of war held by Germany
Writers about globalization
Writers from Rotterdam
20th-century Dutch businesspeople
20th-century Dutch civil servants
20th-century Dutch historians
20th-century Dutch jurists
20th-century Dutch male writers
20th-century Dutch military personnel
20th-century Dutch politicians